South Carolina Highway 3 (SC 3) is a  state highway in the southern part of the U.S. state of South Carolina.

Route description
SC 3 begins at an intersection with U.S. Route 278 (US 278) in rural Jasper County. The route heads northwest, and crosses into Hampton County. Continuing northwest, it intersects US 601 before a brief concurrency with US 321 in Estill. The highway continues northwest into Allendale County. The route continues north until it enters Barnwell County.

US 278/SC 3 form a concurrency into Barnwell. In town, SC 3 splits off to the northeast, intersecting SC 64 and SC 70. The highway heads northeast to Blackville, where it crosses US 78. It then heads northward, crossing the South Fork of the Edisto River, where it enters Orangeburg County. Just before the river, the route begins its last northeastern orientation, passing just east of Springfield, intersecting SC 3 Business and SC 4. SC 3 heads northeast, skirting the Aiken County line, before entering Lexington County.

History

A previous version of SC 3 existed as an original state route, running from Columbia to Sumter, Florence, and Mullins before crossing the North Carolina state line where US 76 does today. In 1927, the route was renumbered as various US highways.

The current version of SC 3 was established in 1928 as a renumbering of the closing SC 1. It originally ran from Allendale to Dixiana.

In 1938, the northern terminus was extended about 3 miles north to West Columbia. In 1939, however, it was pushed back south to Dixiana. In that same year, the southern terminus was extended southward a short distance to Barton. In 1948, the northern terminus was again pushed back, this time to Swansea. The southern terminus was also pushed north back to Allendale. Five years later, in 1953, the southern terminus was moved up north to Barnwell.

In the early 1960s, the northern terminus was extended up to Dixiana once again. In 1962, the highway was extended southward to US 321 in southwest Allendale County. In 1971, the northern terminus was once again moved back south to Swansea. In 1972, the southern terminus was moved southeast to Grays, giving us the current SC 3 routing.

Major intersections

Springfield business route

South Carolina Highway 3 Business (SC 3 Bus.) begins at an intersection with the SC 3 mainline, south-southeast of Springfield. It heads northwest into the city, along Railroad Avenue, to an intersection with SC 4. The two highways share a very brief concurrency to the northeast in town. SC 3 Bus. continues northeast until it meets its northern terminus, another intersection with SC 3, northeast of Springfield.

See also

References

External links

SC 3 at Virginia Highways' South Carolina Highways Annex
SC 3 Business at Virginia Highways' South Carolina Highways Annex

003
Transportation in Jasper County, South Carolina
Transportation in Hampton County, South Carolina
Transportation in Allendale County, South Carolina
Transportation in Barnwell County, South Carolina
Transportation in Orangeburg County, South Carolina
Transportation in Lexington County, South Carolina